Bourg-de-Péage Drôme Handball is the name of a French handball club from Bourg-de-Péage, France. This team currently competes in the French Women's Handball First League from 2017 and they play their home matches in Complexe Vercors. The professionnal team is dissolved in December 2022.

Team

Current squad
Squad for the 2022-23 season.

Goalkeepers
 1  Ditte Vind
 16  Camille Plante 
 70  Emma Perche

LW
 11  Marie Louis
 99  Mathilde Bacca
RW
 2  Emma Rouly
 27  Siobann Delaye
Line players
 19  Aminata Sow
 20  Maëlle Faynel

Back players
LB
 8  Claudine Mendy
 13  Elke Karsten
CB
 10  Lucie Modenel
RB
 4  Maren Marki

Transfers
Transfers for the 2022-23 season

 Joining
  Ditte Vind (GK) (from  Fleury Loiret Handball)
  Julie Cornut (GK)
  Elke Karsten (LB) (from  Molde Elite)
  Mathilde Bacca (LW)
  Siobann Delaye (RW) (from own rows)

 Leaving
  Camille Depuiset (GK) (to  Metz Handball)
  Léna Grandveau (CB) (to  Neptunes de Nantes)
  Manon Houette (LW) (to  Chambray Touraine Handball)
  Kristy Zimmerman (GK) (to  Jeanne d'Arc Dijon Handball)
  Sofia Deen (LB) (to  Mérignac Handball) 
  Marta Mangué (LB) (to  Rocasa Gran Canaria)
  Alexandra do Nascimento (retires)
  Cindy Champion (RB) (retires)

Notable former players
  Amandine Leynaud
  Maud-Éva Copy
  Deonise Cavaleiro
  Anette Helene Hansen
  Cassandra Tollbring
  Hrafnhildur Hanna Þrastardóttir

References

External links
 

French handball clubs
Sport in Drôme
Handball clubs established in 1964
Sports clubs disestablished in 2022
1964 establishments in France
2022 disestablishments in France